Friar Pedro de Aguado (1513 or 1538 – late 16th or early 17th century) was a Spanish Franciscan friar who spent around 15 years in the New Kingdom of Granada, preaching to the indigenous people. During this time he collected source material for a history of the region, and began a manuscript, Recopilación historial, which he completed in Spain between 1576 and 1583 but was unable to publish. The manuscript was used by other historians, but was not published until the twentieth century.

Biography 

De Aguado's date of birth is uncertain. He is believed by Juan Friede to have been baptised in Valdemoro on 26 January 1513, whilst Guillermo Morón argues for 16 February 1538.

Arriving in the New World in 1560 or 1561 in Cartagena, his movements are uncertain until his arrival in Bogotá in 1571, although it is likely he soon left Cartagena to minister to the Muisca. By around 1564 he was a pastor to the Muisca at Cogua, and he was able to build two churches there. Cogua was considered the first Indian town in New Granada where all the Indians were converted to Christianity, an achievement of Aguado's recognised by King Philip II.

In 1571, De Aguado moved to Santafé de Bogotá, and became a "minister provincial" of the local Franciscan Province. In 1575, De Aguado was sent by the Province on a mission to Spain to answer charges that the local monks were greedy and abusive. He was not able to leave Spain to return to Bogotá until 1583. During this time he developed a manuscript on the history of the region, Recopilación historial, begun during his "idle hours" in Bogotá. It is likely that Part I, on Santa Marta and the New Kingdom of Granada, was written in Bogotá, and Part II, on Venezuela and Cartagena, in Spain. De Aguado tried unsuccessfully to secure publication over a number of years. A series of bureaucratic hurdles around censorship were complicated by a change in the rules, invalidating the royal licence to print which de Aguado obtained in 1581, while a second licence in 1582 was complicated by a new requirement to have the printed copy checked against the original manuscript signed off by the king's secretary. Financial difficulties also played a role, but a definitive reason for publication failing to materialise is not known. A planned Part III appears to have been abandoned, possibly in frustration at the difficulties with publication, with the witness statements that would have been the source material left in Spain on his return to Bogotá in 1583.

Dates for De Aguado's death are even less certain than those for his birth; dates vary from 1589 to 1595 to 1608. After his death, his work was used directly and indirectly by other authors, notably by Fray Pedro Simón, who appears to have had access to a copy of Part II of the manuscript which de Aguado took with him on his return to Bogotá. The manuscript De Aguado left in Spain was obtained in the late eighteenth century by the historian Juan Bautista Muñoz; his collection became part of the University of Valencia on his death, and was transferred to the Real Academia de la Historia after the university was partly destroyed in 1812 during a French siege of Valencia. There, the manuscript was discovered in 1845 by Joaquín Acosta, and it was consulted by some historians in the latter part of the nineteenth century. However, it was not published until 1906 (Part I, Historia de Santa Marta y Nuevo Reino de Granada) and 1913 (Part II, Historia de Venezuela).

Works 
 Historia de Santa Marta y Nuevo Reino de Granada (1906) (Part I, Part II – 1916/17 edition by Jerónimo Bécker)
 Historia de Venezuela (1913) (Part I, Part II – 1918/19 edition by Jerónimo Bécker)

References

External links 
 
 
 

Historians of Colombia
Historians of Venezuela
Franciscan missionaries
16th-century births
Year of death uncertain
Muisca scholars